Chelsea Lea Gubecka (born 8 September 1998) is an Australian swimmer. She competed in the women's marathon 10 kilometre event at the 2016 Summer Olympics. In 2018, she finished in 7th place in the women's 10 kilometre open water at the 2018 Pan Pacific Swimming Championships in Tokyo, Japan.

References

External links
 

1998 births
Living people
Australian female swimmers
Female long-distance swimmers
Olympic swimmers of Australia
Swimmers at the 2016 Summer Olympics
People from Nambour, Queensland
21st-century Australian women